John Beaton (born 1982) is a Scottish FIFA referee.

John Beaton may also refer to:

 John Beaton (miner) (1875–1945), Canadian gold miner and businessman
 Jack Beaton or John Beaton (1914–1996), Australian rugby league player
 John Beaton (Canadian football) (born 1950)